Rakeysh Omprakash Mehra (born 7 July 1963) is an Indian film director, occasional actor and screenwriter. He is best known for writing and directing Rang De Basanti (2006) and Bhaag Milkha Bhaag (2013). He is the writer and director of the films Aks (2001) and Delhi-6 (2009).

Early life 
He was born on 7 July 1963 in Delhi. His father worked for the Claridges hotel in New Delhi. He was a part of the selection camp as a swimmer in the 1982 Asian Games held at New Delhi but was not selected in the final round. He studied at Air Force Bal Bharati School in Delhi.

Personal life and thoughts 
In 1992, Mehra married film editor, P. S. Bharathi. The couple have a daughter, Bhairavi, and a son named Vedant.

Mehra criticised the vote-bank politics behind the introduction of the Mandal Commission by VP Singh, and said it inspired him to pen the script of Rang De Basanti.

Mehra has criticised India's education system as being too marks-driven, without any emphasis on actual achievement. Ridiculing the system, he said: "We'd started work on "96.7", till I realised it had become redundant, and I should work on a subject called 100%. It was about the education system. Perhaps I'll make it once I understand the whole system... perhaps my views are very lopsided right now. But the seeds have been sown,". He further added: "Imagine if Shakespeare goes to DU (Delhi University) and he's told, 'We can't take you based on stories you've written as your marksheet isn't that cool.' Or if a Leonardo, or Rabindranath Tagore goes there, and writes something called "Gitanjali" and they tell him, 'Mr Tagore, it's nice to write things such as 'Where the head is held high', but where is your marksheet?"

Career

Ad films 
Mehra started off by selling vacuum cleaners for Eureka Forbes. In 1986, he established Flicks Motion Picture Company Private Limited, starting his career as an advertisement film maker. He directed scores of television commercials for Indian and international clients, including Coke, Pepsi, Toyota, American Express and BPL. He has also directed music videos such as Aby Baby starring Amitabh Bachchan.

Cinema 
Mehra then gradually transited from being an ad-film maker to a feature film maker. In June 2001, his company released its first full-length feature film titled Aks, starring Amitabh Bachchan. Directed by Mehra, Aks was critically acclaimed for Bachchan's performance, but did not do well at the box office.

Mehra's second film, which he produced and directed, was Rang De Basanti. Released in 2006, it starred Aamir Khan and Soha Ali Khan. Mehra received much acclaim for the film, winning award for Best Director at the 2006 Filmfare Award and National Film Award as well as a BAFTA Award nomination for Best Foreign Language Film. The film was also officially chosen as India's entry to the Oscars.

Mehra's third release, again produced and directed by him, was Delhi-6 (2009), starring Abhishek Bachchan, Sonam Kapoor, Om Puri, Waheeda Rehman, and Atul Kulkarni. The film got lukewarm critical response and its performance at the box office was also very lukewarm.

Mehra then produced (but did not direct) the film Teen They Bhai (2011). Directed by debutant Mrighdeep Lamba, it was a story about three brothers who keep fighting amongst themselves. The film neither won any critical acclaim nor did well at the box-office, and was an all-round disaster.

Mehra's next directorial venture was the biopic Bhaag Milkha Bhaag (2013) starring Farhan Akhtar as Milkha Singh, the legendary Indian sprinter. The film, which was produced by a consortium of several producers, was a major commercial and critical success, the second of Mehra's career.

Mehra's latest film is Mirzya (2016), a contemporary retelling of the tragic love story of Mirza & Sahiba. Set in Rajasthan, the film marked the debut of two newcomers, namely Harshvardhan Kapoor (son of actor Anil Kapoor) as Mirzya, and Saiyami Kher, granddaughter of veteran actress Usha Kiran, as Sahiba. Gulzar emerged from a long hiatus to write the screenplay of the film, and Shankar–Ehsaan–Loy were entrusted with the music direction. Released on 7 October 2016, Mirzya proved to be an unmitigated disaster at the box office. Made on a budget of Rs.35 crore (350 million), its total collections over a two-week period amounted to less than Rs.10 crore (100 million). The film, which had been in the planning since at least 2009, and was made over a three-year period, ran for only one week in most theatres, losing nearly all its screens at the end of that period.

Mere Pyare Prime Minister is the other film which has been directed by Rakeysh Omprakash Mehra himself and it is written by Manoj Mairta. It is about an 8-year-old boy wanting to build a toilet for his mother.

Filmography

Onscreen appearances

Music videos

References

External links 

 

1963 births
Living people
Film directors from Delhi
Hindi-language film directors
Punjabi people
Filmfare Awards winners
Screen Awards winners
Zee Cine Awards winners
Film producers from Delhi
Indian male screenwriters
Indian atheists
21st-century Indian film directors
Producers who won the Best Popular Film Providing Wholesome Entertainment National Film Award
Directors who won the Best Popular Film Providing Wholesome Entertainment National Film Award
Producers who won the Best Film on National Integration National Film Award
Directors who won the Best Film on National Integration National Film Award
International Indian Film Academy Awards winners